Craven is an electoral ward within the City of Bradford Metropolitan District Council, West Yorkshire, England. The population of the ward at the 2011 Census was 16,373.

It encompasses the villages of Steeton with Eastburn in the south, Silsden in the centre and Addingham in the north.

It is adjacent to the Craven district of North Yorkshire.

Councillors 
The ward is represented on Bradford Council by 2 Conservative councillors, Owen Goodall  and Peter Clarke, and a councillor for the Green Party, Caroline Whitaker. 

Councillor Owen Goodall, who won his seat in the 2019 local election, is the youngest District Councillor to be elected to Bradford Council.

 indicates seat up for re-election.
 indicates councillor defection.

References

External links 
 BCSP (Internet Explorer only)
 BBC election results
 Council ward profile (pdf)

Wards of Bradford